Louis Sala-Molins (born 1935) is an essayist and political philosophy professor at Paris-I and Toulouse-II universities.

He took part in UNESCO Headquarters to events dedicated to the International Day for the Abolition of Slavery (December 2004). His field of work have been the works by Ramon Llull.

Political and philosophical work (in French)
Le racisme, Philippe Godard and Louis Sala-Molins, 2008
Du crime d'être "noir". Un milliard de "Noirs" dans la prison identitaire, Homnisphères, 2006.
Le livre rouge de Yahvé, La Dispute, 2004.
La Loi, de quel droit ?, Flammarion, 1993.
Louis Sala-Molins - L'Afrique aux Amériques. Le Code noir espagnol, Presses Universitaires de France, 1992.
Les misères des Lumières. Sous la raison, l'outrage, Homnisphères, 1992.
Sodome - Exergue à la philosophie du droit, Albin Michel, 1991.
Le code noir, Presses Universitaires de France, 1987.
Le Dictionnaire des inquisiteurs, Valence, 1494, Galilée,  1981.

English translated work
Dark Side of the Light: Slavery and the French Enlightenment, translated by John Conteh-Morgan, University of Minnesota Press, 2006.

References

French political philosophers
Living people
1935 births
20th-century French philosophers
French male non-fiction writers